Mohni is an island of Estonia. It limits the Eru Bay from the north. The closest settlement at the mainland is Viinistu.

Mohni is part of Lahemaa National Park.

See also
 List of islands of Estonia

References

Islands of Estonia
Kuusalu Parish